
Gmina Secemin is a rural gmina (administrative district) in Włoszczowa County, Świętokrzyskie Voivodeship, in south-central Poland.

Villages
Gmina Secemin contains the villages and settlements of Bichniów, Brzozowa, Celiny, Czaryż, Dąbie, Daleszec, Gabrielów, Gródek, Kluczyce, Krzepice, Krzepin, Kuczków, Lipiny, Maleniec, Marchocice, Międzylesie, Miny, Nadolnik, Osiny, Papiernia, Pniaki, Psary, Psary-Kolonia, Ropocice, Secemin, Wałkonowy Dolne, Wałkonowy Górne, Wincentów, Wola Czaryska, Wola Kuczkowska, Wolica, Zakrzów, Żelisławice, Żelisławiczki and Zwlecza.

Neighbouring gminas
Gmina Secemin is bordered by the gminas of Koniecpol, Radków, Szczekociny and Włoszczowa.

References

Secemin
Włoszczowa County